Senator Huggins may refer to:

Charlie Huggins (born 1947), Alaska State Senate
Waymond C. Huggins (1927–2016), Georgia State Senate